Adolfo Alejandro Esparza Tapia (born 22 August 1969) is a Chilean former footballer who played as a forward.

Club career
A product of Universidad Católica youth system, Esparza made his debut in the 1989 season. In the Chilean Primera División, he also played for Deportes Iquique (1990), Cobresal (1991), Coquimbo Unido (1993–1996) and Provincial Osorno (2000).

In the second level, he played for Rangers de Talca (1992), O'Higgins (1997), Everton (1998) and Deportes Linares (1999).

Esparza also had a stint abroad in the French football.

International career
Esparza represented Chile at under-20 level in the 1988 South American Championship.

Personal life
Esparza graduated as a child care technician thanks to a program from the Integra Foundation, a Chilean state institution. He has served as driver of Jardín Sobre Ruedas (Kindergarten On Wheels) in the O'Higgins Region, a programme that provides education to children who lives far away from cities.

In football, he has worked as coach for the football academy of Universidad Católica based in Coltauco, O'Higgins Region.

References

External links
 Adolfo Esparza at PlaymakerStats.com

1969 births
Living people
Footballers from Santiago
Chilean footballers
Chile under-20 international footballers
Chilean expatriate footballers
Club Deportivo Universidad Católica footballers
Deportes Iquique footballers
Cobresal footballers
Rangers de Talca footballers
Coquimbo Unido footballers
O'Higgins F.C. footballers
Everton de Viña del Mar footballers
Deportes Linares footballers
Provincial Osorno footballers
Chilean Primera División players
Primera B de Chile players
Chilean expatriate sportspeople in France
Expatriate footballers in France
Association football forwards
Chilean football managers